The European Shorthair, called the European in FIFe and WCF, is a cat breed originating in Sweden. The term has also been used as an elaborate way of referring to common domestic cats of Europe, causing some confusion as the pedigree cats of this breed also should resemble the typical domestic cats of Europe. In WCF a similar breed is known as Celtic Shorthair and was at a time considered the same breed, but this breed has some difference from the Europeans, and the WCF now register true Europeans under this breed name instead of under Celtic Shorthair. 

The role as the cat breed resembling the original domestic cats of Europe was held until the beginning of the 20th century by the British Shorthair, even though stockier than the majority of common European cats, until 1949 when the European Shorthair was recognized by the Fédération internationale féline (FIFe). The oldest known European Shorthair registered in FIFe was born in 1940, as the origin of the European Shorthair predates the formation of FIFe in 1949.

Origin
The European can be compared to the kind of domestic cat, which has developed naturally, i.e., without having been subject to special rules for breeding.

European Shorthair has its counterparts in Great Britain (British Shorthair) and the U.S. (American Shorthair), though these breeds have been bred for longer.
The British Shorthair, however, was crossed with the Persian and selectively bred to become a cobbier cat with a slightly shortened muzzle and thicker coat.
It was confusing for Scandinavian breeders that the British Shorthair was also called European Shorthair at that time, even though it looked different. Felinological associations recognized both types of cat as a single breed, meaning they were judged by the same standards during cat shows, until 1982 when FIFE registered the Scandinavian type of European Shorthair as a separate breed with its own standard.

Life expectancy
Life expectancy depends on whether the cat is outdoors or not. An indoor cat has a life expectancy of 14 years on average.

Temperament

The breed has developed from the natural mouse hunters of Europe with the wish to strengthen the most desirable personality traits of the domestic cats. Most European Shorthairs are strong and active, and as a rule they are friendly towards people of all ages. They get on well with other cats and tolerate dogs well. European Shorthairs are intelligent and playful, and most of them are expert at keeping houses and gardens free of all types of rodents. They tend to handle changes and an active home very well, making them suitable for families with children.

Physical characteristics

In terms of appearance the European Shorthair is a very harmonious and supple cat, which should give the overall appearance of medium with no single feature being enlarged or reduced when compared to the original domestic shorthaired cats of Europe. The European Shorthair is a muscular, medium-sized to large cat, with a broad, well-muscled chest. The strong legs are average length and the paws are round. The tail is fairly thick at the base, tapering to a rounded tip.

The head is rounded and should be longer than it is wide, making it not as round as the head of the British Shorthair. The ears are medium-sized; the width of the ear corresponds to the height of the ears, which has a slightly rounded tip. They are quite wide-set and upright. The eyes are rounded and may be of any colour.

The European Shorthair's dense coat is short, glossy and springy; meaning it should lie down again after having been ruffled by a hand going against the hairs. The European Shorthair should only be shorthaired.
All natural colours are permitted, such as black, red, blue and cream, with or without tabby, silver or white markings, though the combination of tabby with white and smoke with white is not allowed in FIFe. Pure white is also permitted. The eye colour corresponds to the coat colour and may be yellow, green or orange. Blue or odd-eyed individuals are permitted if the coat colour is white.

Breed description
 Head: Fairly broad with rounded contours but a bit longer than it is wide. Slightly rounded skull and forehead. Well-developed cheeks, especially in males. Straight, moderately long and broad nose with a gentle curve between the eyes. A stop is not allowed. Rounded, firm chin.
 Ears: Medium in size, slightly rounded at the tips and may be tufted. The height of the ears corresponds to the width of the base.
 Eyes: Large, round, widely separated, set at a slight slant. Colour must be clear and pure and correspond to that of the coat.
 Neck: Moderately long and muscular.
 Body: Fairly long, not stout. Stocky, strong, muscular. Broad, well-developed chest.
 Members: Strong and sturdy, medium in length and narrowing steadily into firm, round paws.
 Paw: Moderately long, strong, solid, tapering evenly to the paws, which are round and firm.
 Tail: Moderately long, fairly thick at the base, tapering gradually to a rounded tip.
 Coat: Short, dense, close-lying, lustrous hair. Recognised colours depends on organisation. None allow chocolate, lilac, cinnamon, fawn, amber, ticked tabby, or any of the colourpoint varieties.
 Faults: Body too large or too stout or cobby. Strong resemblance to British Shorthair or American Shorthair. Pendulous cheeks. Hanging jowls. Clear stop. Long, woolly fur.

Rare: A black spot for the head, and a black tail with a white dot at the end.

Popularity
The breed is mostly popular in Scandinavia, as there are still huge populations of similar-looking cats in Europe, and the European Shorthairs are for those appreciating a supple breed which has had a selection for a good temper. The European Shorthair is on the list of endangered breeds in Sweden and is the national cat of Finland.

See also

 Domestic short-haired cat

References

External links

 Cats United International
 

Cat breeds
Cat breeds originating in Sweden
Natural cat breeds